is a Japanese fruit candy sold by Morinaga & Company.

Origin 
Hi-Chew candy was first released in 1975. It was re-released in the packaging of individually wrapped candies in February 1996.

The origins of Hi-Chew began when Taichiro Morinaga sought to create an edible kind of chewing gum that could be swallowed because of the Japanese cultural taboo against taking food out of one's mouth. Morinaga already produced caramel. By combining his chewy caramel with flavoring, Morinaga was able to create his new candy called Chewlets in 1931. Morinaga, whose business was hampered immensely by World War II, had to rebuild his company from scratch, and Chewlets were reintroduced in the form of Hi-Chews, as they are known today.

Description 
Hi-Chew candies are individually wrapped in logo-stamped foil or plain white wax paper (depending on the localization). Each individual candy piece consists of an outer white coating (this is the same for most flavors) and a colored, flavored interior.  The exceptions to this rule are the Strawberry Cheesecake, Yogurt, and Cotton Candy, Sweet and Sour Mix, and Superfruit Mix flavors, which have an outer colored coating with a white, flavored inside, whereas the Cola flavored Hi-Chews are brown colored.

The texture is similar to a cross between chewing gum and fruit-flavored candies in the United States and other western countries such as the German brand Mamba or the British brand Starburst. Hi-Chew is commonly sold in Taiwan, Shanghai, Singapore, and Hong Kong. Outside of Asia the candy is sold in specialty shops and import stores.. 

Special editions are sometimes released, normally focusing on a specific fruit farmed in Japan and the location where they are grown; examples include Seto Inland Sea Lemon and Okinawan Shikuwasa.

Starting in 2012, Hi-Chew became a gluten-free product. Although the candy never actually contained gluten ingredients, it had been processed in factories that processed gluten. Hi-Chew contains gelatin ingredients derived from pork, so it is not halal, kosher, or vegetarian.

Hi-Chew's ingredients include glucose syrup, sugar, hydrogenated palm kernel oil, gelatin, natural and artificial flavors, strawberry juice from concentrate, DL-malic acid, citric acid, emulsifiers, sodium lactate solution, and natural colors (beta-carotene, carmine). Hi-Chew may contain soybeans. Product could also be processed in facilities with dairy products.

In the United States
After seeing increased sales in Salt Lake City in the early 2010s attributed to Latter-Day Saint missionaries who had visited Japan, Hi-Chew began a marketing campaign with Major League Baseball players. U.S. sales then grew from $8 million in 2012 to more than $100 million in 2021. 

Hi-Chew is available in twenty one flavors in the United States: Blue Hawaii (a citrus and pineapple flavor), blue raspberry, rainbow sherbert, raspberry, blueberry, black cherry, watermelon, green apple, dragonfruit, strawberry, grapefruit, kiwi, mango, grape, lemon, açai, cola, banana, yogurt, lilikoi, and pineapple. Hi-Chew Sours and Hi-Chew Bites were released in February 2016. Hi-Chew Sours include flavors such as lemon, lime, and grapefruit. Hi-Chew Bites are soft chew candy blended with already established flavors, being offered in "grape and strawberry" and "mango and orange". Since its inception, over 170 flavors have been created.

In early 2018, Hi-Chew began a contest known as "East meets West", in which user-submitted votes decided which of their Japanese line of flavors should be introduced to a Western audience. On April 11, 2018, Hi-Chew's Instagram account officially announced that Dragon Fruit had won the competition and would be coming to the United States the following year.

As of 2023 in the United States, Hi-Chew is sold at Walmart, Target, 7-Eleven, Staples, Walgreens, Dick's Sporting Goods, Five Below, H Mart, CVS Pharmacy, Nordstrom Rack, Best Buy, FedEx Office, and other chain stores.

Product recall
In 2008, Morinaga recalled some of its Hi-Chew products due to complaints that rubber-like material had been found in the candy. The source of this turned out to have come from a piece of a worker's glove that had fallen into the cooking vat in the Hyogo Morinaga factory.  The green apple and grape flavored varieties of Hi-Chew that had a 2009 expiration date were recalled.  Some of the affected products also had been exported to Hong Kong, where the Centre for Food Safety monitored the situation and warned the public against its purchase or consumption.

See also 
 Puccho

References

External links 
Hi-chew official site (Japanese)
Hi-chew (English)

Japanese snack food
Japanese brand foods
Morinaga & Company
Candy